Schwarzenburg railway station is a railway station in the municipality of Schwarzenburg, in the Swiss canton of Bern. It is the southern terminus of the standard gauge Bern–Schwarzenburg line of BLS AG.

Services 
The following services stop at Schwarzenburg:

References

External links 
 
 

Railway stations in the canton of Bern
BLS railway stations